Best Of TH is the first compilation album by German rock band Tokio Hotel, it was released December 14, 2010 internationally, and in Germany on December 13, 2010.

The album is composed of songs from their studio albums Schrei (2005), Zimmer 483 (2007), Scream (2007) and Humanoid (2009), plus two previously unreleased songs; the first, "Mädchen aus dem All", was originally recorded to be released on Schrei while the second song, "Hurricanes And Suns", was recorded in 2009. It was released in three major formats: standard edition, German and English; and a limited deluxe edition, including both German and English editions and a bonus DVD comprising the majority of Tokio Hotel's music videos and the "Making Of" videos for selected music videos.

Track listing

German version
 "Durch den Monsun"
 "Der letzte Tag"
 "Mädchen aus dem All"
 "Übers Ende der Welt"
 "Schrei"
 "An deiner Seite (Ich bin da)
 "Spring nicht"
 "Automatisch"
 "Lass uns laufen"
 "Geisterfahrer"
 "Ich brech aus
 "Für immer jetzt"
 "Rette mich"
 "1000 Meere"
 "Komm"
 "Sonnensystem"
 "Humanoid"
 "Hurricanes And Suns" (Bonus Track)

English version
 "Darkside Of The Sun"
 "Monsoon"
 "Hurricanes And Suns"
 "Ready, Set, Go!"
 "World Behind My Wall"
 "Scream"
 "Automatic"
 "Phantomrider"
 "Break Away"
 "Final Day"
 "Forever Now"
 "By Your Side"
 "Rescue Me"
 "1000 Oceans"
 "Noise"
 "Don’t Jump"
 "Humanoid"
 "Madchen Aus Dem All" (Bonus Track)

Limited Deluxe edition
Features the tracks found on the English and German editions on two CDs but also one bonus DVD of all the band's music videos, with the exceptions of 1000 Meere and 1000 Oceans, as well as the "Making Of"'s several selected music videos.

DVD 1 - Music Videos
 "Durch den Monsun"
 "Monsoon"
 "Schrei"
 "Scream"
 "Rette mich"
 "Der letzte Tag"
 "Wir schliessen uns ein"
 "Übers Ende der Welt"
 "Ready, Set, Go!"
 "Spring nicht"
 "Don't Jump"
 "An deiner Seite (Ich bin da)"
 "By Your Side"
 "Automatisch"
 "Automatic"
 "Lass uns laufen"
 "World Behind my Wall"
 "Darkside of the Sun"

Making of
 Making of "Monsoon" (subtitled)
 Making of "Schrei" (lacking subtitles)
 Making of "Übers Ende der Welt" (subtitled)
 Making of "Spring Nicht" (lacking subtitles)
 Making of "Automatic" (lacking subtitles)
 Making of "World Behind My Wall" (subtitled)

Personnel
Vocals: Bill Kaulitz
Guitars: Tom Kaulitz
Bass: Georg Listing
Drums: Gustav Schäfer
Executive producers: Patrick Benzer, Dave Roth, David Jost, Peter Hoffman
Co-producers: Bill Kaulitz and Tom Kaulitz
Management: David Jost and Benjamin Ebel

References

2010 compilation albums
Tokio Hotel compilation albums